The Royal Basilica of Our Lady of Atocha or Real Basílica de Nuestra Señora de Atocha is a large church in central Madrid on Avenida de la Ciudad de Barcelona, 1.

History

It is one of the six basilica churches in Madrid, alongside the Our Father Jesús de Medinaceli, San Francisco el Grande, St. Michael's Basilica, Madrid, Basílica Hispanoamericana de Nuestra Señora de la Merced, and Church of La Milagrosa.

The buildings on the site have a long history. The original name refers to a lost icon from a chapel which was found among some high grasses -referred to as tocha- during the time of the Reconquista. The old church was in disrepair and rebuilt in the 1890s in a Neo-Byzantine style designed by Fernando Arbós y Tremanti.

The church was destroyed during the Spanish Civil War and reconstruction completed in 1951.

Adjacent to the church is the Pantheon of Illustrious Men or Panteón de Hombres Ilustres of Madrid. It holds the remains of only a former president of the council of ministers, José Canalejas, however it also contains a number of interesting monuments from and just after the turn of the 19th century.

See also
Catholic Church in Spain
List of oldest church buildings

References

Roman Catholic churches in Madrid
Basilica churches in Spain
20th-century Roman Catholic church buildings in Spain
Buildings and structures in Pacífico neighborhood, Madrid